Ilat-e Qaqazan-e Sharqi Rural District is a rural district (dehestan) in Kuhin District, Qazvin County, Qazvin Province, Iran. At the 2006 census, its population was 9,880, in 2,284 families.  The rural district has 29 villages.

References 

Rural Districts of Qazvin Province
Qazvin County